The 2010 World Sambo Championships was held in Tashkent, Uzbekistan between 4 and 8 November 2010.
This tournament included competition in both sport Sambo, and Combat Sambo.

Categories 
Combat Sambo: 52 kg, 57 kg, 62 kg, 68 kg, 74 kg, 82 kg, 90 kg, 100 kg, +100 kg
Men's Sambo: 52 kg, 57 kg, 62 kg, 68 kg, 74 kg, 82 kg, 90 kg, 100 kg, +100 kg
Women's Sambo: 48 kg, 52 kg, 56 kg, 60 kg, 64 kg, 68 kg, 72 kg, 80 kg, +80 kg

Medal overview

Combat Sambo Events

Women's events

Men's Sambo Events

External links 

World Sambo Championships
2010 in Uzbekistani sport
Sport in Tashkent
2010 in sambo (martial art)
21st century in Tashkent